The Tietê Bus Terminal is the largest bus terminal in Latin America, and the second largest in the world, after the Port Authority Bus Terminal in New York City. The terminal is located in the Santana district in the city of São Paulo, Brazil. The official name in Portuguese is Terminal Rodoviário Governador Carvalho Pinto, named after Carlos Alberto Alves de Carvalho Pinto, a former Governor of the State of São Paulo.

Operations 
There are 65 bus companies, 135 ticket counters, and 304 bus lines, serving 1,010 cities in five countries (Brazil, Argentina, Chile, Uruguay, and Paraguay). To accommodate this volume, there are 70 boarding platforms and 19 platforms for arrivals. On the busiest days, according to need, the platforms can be reversed. Coaches also have a "waiting parking lot", which has a capacity of 70 vehicles. The terminal has a daily circulation of 90,000 people and 3,000 buses. Around 295 workers are employed by the terminal for administrative, operational, janitorial, and security purposes. In 2002, the terminal began offering "check-in" service like at an airport for long-distance voyages. Passengers may check their luggage at a baggage counter. Electronic display panels show arrivals and departures at each platform.

The terminal can also be accessed via the Portuguesa-Tietê station on Line 1 of the São Paulo Metro.

Gardens 
The terminal features a  garden including more than 40 species of trees.

Additional services 
The terminal offers 53 shops, 11 commercial vendor kiosks, 21 food-service vendors, a travel agency, free WiFi connection, free charging stations for laptops and cell phones, a pharmacy, a post office, a vaccination clinic, and 9 ATMs.

Locations served 
Locations served by the Tietê Bus Terminal are:
 State of São Paulo
Regions
Ribeirão Preto
Araraquara
São Carlos
Franca
Piracicaba
Campinas
Jundiaí
Bragança Paulista
Vale do Paraíba
Litoral Norte
 North Region (Except the states of Roraima, Amazonas, Amapá and Acre)
 Northeast Region
 Southeast Region
 Central-West Region (Except the states of Mato Grosso and Mato Grosso do Sul)
 South Region (Except the state of Paraná)
 Curitiba, Campo Mourão Paraná
 Argentina
 Chile
 Paraguay
 Uruguay

* The remaining locations are served by the Palmeiras-Barra Funda and Jabaquara bus terminals.

Companies and destinations 
The following companies operate in the terminal.  Major destinations are shown in parentheses.

Domestic destinations 
São Paulo
Greater São Paulo
Anhangüera (Jandira, Itapevi)
Imigrantes (São Bernardo do Campo, Diadema)
Internorte (Guarulhos, Mairiporã, Arujá, Santa Isabel)
Intervias (Itapecerica da Serra, Embu, Taboão da Serra, Juquitiba, São Lourenço da Serra)
Unileste (Mogi das Cruzes, Suzano, Itaquaquecetuba, Arujá, Guararema, Ferraz de Vasconcelos, Poá)
Airports
Airport Service (São Paulo-Guarulhos International Airport)
VB Transportes (Viracopos-Campinas International Airport)
Interior
Atibaia (Atibaia, Mairiporã, Nazaré Paulista, Piracaia, Joanópolis)
Bonavita (Limeira, Rio Claro, Paulínia, Capivari, Indaiatuba)
Bragança (Bragança Paulista, Atibaia, Mairiporã, Pinhalzinho, Águas de Lindóia)
Caprioli Turismo (Campo Limpo Paulista, Várzea Paulista, Monte Mor, Capivari, Rafard)
Cometa (Campinas, Jundiaí, Ribeirão Preto, São Carlos, Araraquara, Franca, Mogi Mirim, Mogi Guaçu, Aparecida)
Expresso Cristália (Campinas, Itapira, Mogi Mirim, Mogi Guaçu, Espírito Santo do Pinhal)
Empresa Cruz (Araraquara, São Carlos, Ibitinga, Itápolis, Iacanga, Taquaritinga, Novo Horizonte, Borborema, Gavião Peixoto)
Danúbio Azul (Araraquara, Araras, Barretos, Bebedouro, Jaboticabal, Matão, Leme, Olímpia, Pirassununga, Santa Rita do Passa Quatro)
Viação Lira (Campinas, Valinhos, Vinhedo)
Litorânea (Salesópolis, Paraibuna)
Nasser (Mococa, Cajuru, São José do Rio Pardo)
Ouro Verde (Americana, Sumaré, Nova Odessa)
Pássaro Marron (São José dos Campos, Mogi das Cruzes, Aparecida, Campos do Jordão, Caçapava, Guaratinguetá, Pindamonhangaba, Taubaté, Queluz, Bananal, Jacareí)
Piracicabana (Piracicaba, Americana, Santa Bárbara d'Oeste, Nova Odessa, Águas de São Pedro, São Pedro)
Rápido Fênix Viação (Jundiaí, Itatiba, Jaguariúna, Águas de Lindóia, Bragança Paulista, Morungaba, Pedreira, Serra Negra)
Rápido Luxo Campinas (Várzea Paulista)
Rápido Ribeirão (Ribeirão Preto, Sertãozinho)
Rápido Sumaré (Sumaré, Hortolândia)
Real Expresso (Ituverava, Igarapava, Orlândia, Guará, Aramina)
Santa Cruz (São João da Boa Vista, Caconde, Vargem Grande do Sul)
São Pedro (São Pedro, Piracicaba, Americana)
VB Transportes  (Artur Nogueira, Capivari,  Cordeirópolis, Cosmópolis, Eng. Coelho, Indaiatuba, Limeira, Paulínia, Rio Claro, Santa Gertrudes)
Coastal
Litorânea (Bertioga, Caraguatatuba, São Sebastião, Ubatuba, Ilhabela)

Rio de Janeiro
1001 (Rio de Janeiro, Búzios, Cabo Frio, Nova Iguaçu, Nova Friburgo, Rio das Ostras, Niterói, Macaé, Campo Grande)
Cometa (Volta Redonda, Três Rios, Resende, Barra Mansa, Itatiaia)
Expresso Brasileiro (Rio de Janeiro, Nova Iguaçu, Duque de Caxias)
Expresso do Sul (Rio de Janeiro)
Itapemirim (Rio de Janeiro, Campos dos Goytacazes, Duque de Caxias)
Reunidas Paulista (Angra dos Reis, Paraty, Itaguaí)
Salutaris (Barra do Piraí, Magé, Petrópolis, Vassouras, Teresópolis)

Minas Gerais
Bragança (Extrema, Cambuí, Pouso Alegre, Varginha, São Gonçalo do Sapucaí, Monte Sião, Ouro Fino)
Cambuí (Cambuí, Itapeva, Extrema, Camanducaia)
Campo Belo (Campo Belo, Perdões, Arantina, Formiga)
Cometa (Belo Horizonte, Juiz de Fora, Poços de Caldas, São Lourenço, Caxambu, Cruzília)
Continental (Araxá, João Pinheiro, Patos de Minas, Paracatu, São Gotardo)
Expresso União (Passos, São Sebastião do Paraíso, Itaú de Minas)
Gardênia (São João del Rey, Ouro Fino, Lavras, Nazareno, Barbacena, Barroso, Bom Sucesso)
Gontijo (Belo Horizonte, Bocaiuva, Montes Claros, Sete Lagoas, Januária, Almenara, Janaúba, Espinosa )
Itapemirim (Governador Valadares, Teófilo Otoni, Ipatinga, Caratinga, Muriaé)
Nacional Expresso (Uberlândia, Frutal, Monte Alegre de Minas, Ituverava)
Nasser (Guaxupé, Muzambinho, São Sebastião do Paraíso)
Pássaro Marron (Itajubá, Paraisópolis, Brasópolis, Delfim Moreira)
Real Expresso (Uberaba, Araguari)
Salutaris (Viçosa, Jequitinhonha, Visconde do Rio Branco, Coimbra, Almenara, Raul Soares, Ubá)
Santa Cruz (Muzambinho, Poços de Caldas, Paraguaçu, Alfenas, Três Corações, Pouso Alegre, São Thomé das Letras, Itajubá, Santa Rita do Sapucaí, Ouro Fino, Itajubá, Lambari).
Santa Teresinha (Varginha, Boa Esperança, Três Pontas)
São Cristóvão (Divinópolis, Abaeté, Itapecerica, Lagoa da Prata, Pitangui)
São Geraldo (Teófilo Otoni)
Util (Ouro Preto, Ouro Branco, Mariana, Santos Dumont, Conselheiro Lafaiete, Barbacena, Barroso, Lavras, São João del Rey, Lagoa Dourada, Nazareno)

Paraná
Cometa (Curitiba)
Itapemirim (Curitiba)
Penha (Paranaguá)
Pluma (Foz do Iguaçu)
Transbrasil (Campo Mourão)

Santa Catarina
1001 (Florianópolis, Balneário Camboriú, Joinville, Itajaí)
Catarinense (Florianópolis, Blumenau, Itajaí, Balneário Camboriú, Joinville, Lages, Brusque, Rio do Sul, Tijucas)
Eucatur (Balneário Camboriú, Tubarão, Laguna, Imbituba)
Pluma (Balneário Camboriú, Criciúma, Araranguá)
Reunidas Transportes (Florianópolis, Balneário Camboriú, Chapecó, Laguna, Tubarão, Curitibanos, Campos Novos, Dionísio Cerqueira, Caçador, Joaçaba, Mafra, Canoinhas)

Rio Grande do Sul
Itapemirim (Porto Alegre)
Penha (Porto Alegre, Bagé, Pelotas, Caxias do Sul, Novo Hamburgo, São Leopoldo, Santa Cruz do Sul, Santana do Livramento, Rio Grande)
Pluma (São Borja, São Gabriel, Uruguaiana, Passo Fundo, Santa Maria)
Real Turismo (Ijuí, Passo Fundo, Santo Ângelo)
Reunidas Transportes (Erechim, Frederico Westphalen, Passo Fundo, Santa Rosa)
TTL (Chuí)

Distrito Federal
Rápido Federal (Brasília)
Real Expresso (Brasília)

Espírito Santo
Águia Branca (Vitória, Serra, Ibiraçu, Colatina)
Itapemirim (Cachoeiro do Itapemirim, Vitória, Vila Velha, Afonso Cláudio, Iúna)
São Geraldo (Linhares, São Mateus)

Goiás
Expresso São Luís (Bom Jesus de Goiás)
Nacional Expresso (Goiânia, Caldas Novas, Itumbiara)
Rápido Federal (Cristalina)
Real Expresso (Anápolis, Catalão)
Reunidas Paulista (Trindade)
Rotas do Triângulo (Goiânia, Goiatuba)
Transbrasiliana (Anápolis, Açailândia)

Tocantins
Gontijo (Palmas)
Reunidas Paulista (Palmas)
Transbrasiliana (Paraíso do Tocantins)

Bahia
Emtram (Barreiras, Rui Barbosa, Xique-Xique, Irecê, Seabra, Morro do Chapéu)
Novo Horizonte (Brumado, Macaúbas, Caetité, Abaíra, Ibipitanga)
Salutaris (Vitória da Conquista, Poções)
São Geraldo (Salvador, Feira de Santana, Vitória da Conquista, Porto Seguro, Ilhéus, Jequié)
Viação Nacional (Salvador, Feira de Santana)
Gontijo (Bom Jesus da Lapa, Guanambi, Feira de Santana, Santana, Jeremoabo, Miguel Calmon, Monte Santo, Paulo Afonso, Ubatã, Euclides da Cunha, Juazeiro, Ribeira do Pombal)

Pernambuco
Itapemirim (Recife)
São Geraldo (Recife, Garanhuns)
Gontijo (Petrolina)

Ceará
Gontijo (Fortaleza, Crato, Iguatu, Crateús, Sobral)
Penha (Fortaleza)
Itapemirim (Sobral)

Maranhão
Itapemirim (São Luís, Imperatriz)

Piauí
Gontijo (Teresina)
Itapemirim (Teresina, Canto do Buriti, Picos)

Paraíba
Itapemirim (João Pessoa)
Penha (Campina Grande)
Gontijo (Patos)

Alagoas
São Geraldo (Maceió, Atalaia, Arapiraca)
Viação Nacional (Maceió)

Sergipe
São Geraldo (Aracaju)
Viação Nacional (Propriá)

Rio Grande do Norte
São Geraldo (Natal, Mossoró, Currais Novos)
Gontijo (Caicó)
Viação Nacional (Natal)

Pará
Itapemirim (Belém)
Transbrasiliana (Belém, Altamira, Carajás, Marabá)

Rondônia
Nacional Expresso (Ji-Paraná)

Acre
Rotas do Triângulo (Rio Branco)

International destinations 
Argentina
Crucero Del Norte (Buenos Aires, Bariloche, Rosário, Santa Fé, Puerto Iguazú, Posadas)
Pluma Internacional (Buenos Aires, Paso de los Libres)
Penha (Córdoba, Santa Fé, Resistência, Corrientes)
Chile
Chile Bus (Santiago)
Pluma Internacional (Santiago)
Paraguay
Brujula (Asunción, Ciudad del Este, Coronel Oviedo)
Pluma Internacional (Asunción, Ciudad del Este)
Sol del Paraguay (Asunción, Ciudad del Este, Coronel Oviedo)
Uruguay
EGA/Revelación (Montevideo, Punta del Este, San Carlos)
TTL (Montevideo, Punta del Este, San Carlos)
Peru
Ormeño (Lima, Cuzco)

References

External links 
 

Transport in São Paulo
Bus stations in Brazil